Lisa Arch ( Kushell; born November 23, 1971) is an American actress and comedian, known for her recurring role on Curb Your Enthusiasm as Cassie with wife of Larry's cousin, Andy, her roles in the 1997–98 season of the FOX Network comedy show, Mad TV, as cohost of TBS's Dinner and a Movie from 2002 to 2005,  and as the recurring character of Samantha Samuels on Disney Channel's Cory in the House. Arch has also been in movies, such as 2001's Legally Blonde.

Personal life 
Born Lisa Kushell in Los Angeles, California, she began acting on stage at 15 years old in the sketch comedy troupe Upstage Comedy. Arch has often stated that her parents were extremely supportive of her and they allowed her to hone her skills in their "unfurnished living room" until she graduated from high school. She earned her SAG card with one line as a waitress on Dream On. After her first appearance, she began appearing on such shows as Seinfeld, The X-Files, and For Your Love.

She has an older brother, Bob Kushell, who is a TV writer/producer and Internet talk show host. Her brother worked with her husband in 2009, Russell Arch, as the Co-Creator and Executive Producer of ANYTIME WITH BOB KUSHELL, an internet talkshow for Sony Interactive's Crackle.com.

On September 18, 2007, she gave birth to a son, Garrett Mitchell Arch.

Career

Curb Your Enthusiasm 
Arch was cast on Curb Your Enthusiasm in 2009 as "Cassie", the wife of Larry's "Cousin Andy" played by Richard Kind. She appeared in the Season 7 episode entitled "The Black Swan" and played a new mom who had a side-business where she made colorful, ornate cowboy hats. She also appeared in Season 10 episodes #2 & #3 entitled "Side Sitting" and "Artificial Fruit". In "Fruit" she has a featured role where she asks Larry to draw a doodle for charity, but later on blames him for not putting in enough effort on his artwork.

Mad TV 
Arch joined the cast of Mad TV in 1997, as a repertory performer, for the third season. She would be promoted to repertory status mid-season. She is remembered for playing characters like social outcast Susan Whitfield and sassy country gal Wanda Terry-Ann Lainier Parker from the Parker Sisters sketches.

Arch also flexed her comedy muscles with her celebrity impressions, of public figures like Paula Jones. She also lampooned Hollywood stars like Farrah Fawcett, Demi Moore, Alyson Hannigan, Lori Loughlin and Hope Summers.  She has also impersonated singers like Melanie C, Alanis Morissette and Fiona Apple.

After one season on the show, Arch left Mad TV at the conclusion of season three to pursue other career opportunities.

Other television projects 
Since Leaving Mad TV, Arch has done many guest appearances and voice overs. She has appeared in such commercials as "Mervyn's" and "Southern Comfort."

She has featured on the Comedy Central show Crank Yankers as the voice of "Cammie", an airheaded, bisexual party-girl in her early twenties. She also played the role of Samantha Samuels on the Disney Channel show Cory in the House. She has also had a part in the children's TV program Hannah Montana as a photographer. Arch can be seen on a regular basis at Los Angeles' ACME Comedy Theater and recently hosted a special episode of Reel Comedy about the movie, Bewitched.  She also has made numerous guest appearances on television shows, including Reno 911!, Seinfeld, and The X-Files.  Also she was in Austin & Ally as Damonica Dixon.

Dinner and a Movie 
In 2001, Arch's career got a boost when she replaced Annabelle Gurwitch as the hostess of the TBS cooking and entertainment show, Dinner and a Movie. For two and a half years, she appeared, alongside host Paul Gilmartin and chef Claud Mann, in each episode introducing movies and cracking jokes during the preparation of a creative dinner to go with some theme of the movie.

Filmography

Film

Television

Voice acting and video game

External links 

1971 births
Living people
20th-century American actresses
21st-century American actresses
Actresses from Los Angeles
American child actresses
American film actresses
American television actresses
American stage actresses
American women comedians
People from Woodland Hills, Los Angeles
American sketch comedians
Comedians from California
20th-century American comedians
21st-century American comedians